Bernhard Starkbaum (born February 19, 1986) is an Austrian professional ice hockey goaltender who is playing for the Vienna Capitals of the ICE Hockey League (ICEHL).

Playing career 
Starkbaum first played as a youth as a product of Wiener EV. From 2006 to 2012, he played for Villacher SV in the Austrian Hockey League and then took his game to Sweden.

After spending four years in Swedish ice hockey, one year with Modo Hockey and three with Brynäs IF, he returned to his native Austria, signing with EC Salzburg in May 2016.

Starkbaum endured a shortened stint with EHC Kloten of the Swiss League before returning to the EBEL, agreeing to terms with the Vienna Capitals midway through the 2017–18 season on 12 January 2018.

International play
Starkbaum was a member of Austria's national teams at the U18 and U20 levels and later became a regular on the country's men's national team. He competed at the 2014 Olympic Games and won gold at the 2010 World Championship Division 1 Group A. He received Best Goaltender honors at the 2016 World Championship Division 1 Group A.

References

External links

1986 births
Living people
Austrian ice hockey goaltenders
Brynäs IF players
EHC Kloten players
Modo Hockey players
Ice hockey players at the 2014 Winter Olympics
Olympic ice hockey players of Austria
EC Red Bull Salzburg players
Ice hockey people from Vienna
Vienna Capitals players
EC VSV players